Warp Zone is Martyr's 2nd full-length album. It was released independently on March 11, 2000. A European edition was released by Sekhmet Records which contained two bonus tracks, several live videos and other multi-media. In October 2006, Galy Records released a re-issue containing four bonus tracks.

Matt Heafy of Trivium called it one of his favorite albums and said "This has been a hugely influential album on me, and they’re a band that I feel are way underrated. They’re a band so many people haven’t heard about but this album is truly a gem. Everyone’s putting technical and jazz elements of things like virtuoso guitarist Allan Holdsworth in there, but these guys were doing it before all of them and Martyr don’t do it for the sake of it, they do it for the sake of new sounding songs. The band incorporate jazz, thrash, death and tech and so much more. They really have their own sound."

Track listing

Personnel
 Daniel Mongrain  – clean vocals, guitar
 Pier-Luc Lampron – guitar
 François Mongrain – bass, death growls
 Patrice Hamelin drums, percussion
 Luc Lemay – narration on Realms of Reverie

References 

2000 albums
Martyr (band) albums
Galy Records albums